The 2021 Singapore Premier League (also known as the AIA Singapore Premier League due to sponsorship reasons) was the 4th season of the Singapore Premier League, the top-flight Singaporean professional league for association football clubs, since its rebranding in 2018. 

The champions of the 2021 Singapore Premier League, Lion City Sailors, qualified for the AFC Champions League group stage automatically. The season began on 13 March and ended on 10 October. In the first part of the season, all matches were played behind closed doors in light of the COVID-19 situation.

Format
The following key changes were made to the rules since the 2020 season:  

 Local SPL clubs are required to have a minimum of six U-23 players for a squad size of 19 to 25 players; this increases to seven (squad size 26), eight (27) and nine (28).

New rules for 2021:
 All SPL teams will play each other thrice. 
 Each team is able to register up to 25 players in their squad, an reduction of 3 players as compared from 2020.
 From 2021, Albirex is allowed to sign a maximum of 2 overage Singaporean players.  As in 2019 and 2020, Albirex must have two Singaporeans in their starting lineup for each game.
 Young Lions and Lion City Sailors Football Club to play their home games at Jalan Besar Stadium while Balestier Khalsa will play at Toa Payoh Stadium.   Bishan Stadium is under renovation till end of season.  Other stadiums used are: (1) Our Tampines Hub (Tampines Rovers and Geylang International), Hougang Stadium (Hougang United) and (3) Jurong East Stadium (Albirex Niigata and Tanjong Pagar United).
 Clubs will be equipped with Global Positioning Systems (GPS) devices – among other performance and tracking gear. Value of this sponsorship is  worth around $620,000.
 SPL clubs are now allowed to register a maximum of four foreign players with no age restrictions, of whom at least one shall be of the nationality of an AFC Member Association (Asian). A maximum of four foreign players may be named or fielded in any one match.
 Local SPL clubs, excluding Albirex Niigata (S) and Young Lions, are required to have a minimum of six local U-23 players (born on or after 1 January 1998) for a squad size of 18 (minimum) to 25 (maximum) players. At least eight local U-30 players (born on or after 1 January 1991) have to be registered as well.
 Players shall be allocated jersey numbers 1 to 40. Jersey numbers become available for allocation to new members after a player ceases to play for a club.
 2019 champions, DPMM FC, will continue to sit out of the competition due to the restriction imposed by the Brunei Government.
 2021 Singapore Cup is slated to commence in September 2021.  The mandatory fielding of Under-23 local players for participating clubs shall not apply for matches in the 2021 Singapore Cup as to allow the National Under-22 team to have adequate centralised preparations and subsequent participation for this year's AFC Under-23 Qualifiers and the SEA Games.
 1st transfer window: 1 Jan 2021 to 20 March 2021, 2nd transfer window: 17 May 2021 to 13 June 2021

Teams 
A total of 8 teams competed in the league. Albirex Niigata (S) from Japan was the only foreign team invited.

Stadiums and locations

Personnel and sponsors 
Note: Flags indicate national team as has been defined under FIFA eligibility rules. Players may hold more than one non-FIFA nationality.

Coaching changes

Foreign Players

Singapore Premier League clubs can sign a maximum of four foreign players in the 2021 season, up from three as compared to 2019. However, one of them has to be 21 years old or younger on 1 January 2021 (Or at the age of registration).

Albirex Niigata can sign up unlimited number of Singaporean players for the new season. Only 2 local player above 23 years old is allowed.

Players name in bold indicates the player was registered during the mid-season transfer window.

Note 1: From 2021, Albirex, a Japanese club, is allowed to sign a maximum of 2 Singaporean players above the age of 23.

Note 2: Song Ui-Young is granted Singapore citizenship on 21 August 2021.

Results

League table

Fixtures and results
Clubs will play each other three times for 21 matches each.

Matches 1–14

Matches 15–21

Statistics

Top scorers

 As of 10 October 2021

Top Assists
 As at 10 October 2021

Clean Sheets
 As at 3 October 2021

Hat-tricks 
 As of 10 October 2021

4 Player scored 4 goals

Penalty missed

Awards

Monthly awards

Singapore Premier League Awards night winners

References

External links

 Football Association of Singapore website
 Singapore Premier League website

2021
1
2021 in Asian association football leagues